"ecstasy", is a single by Japanese rock duo B'z. It was released on January 14, 2015. It is the only single of their nineteenth album Epic Day.

The song debuted in number one on the weekly Oricon Singles Chart, with 133,980 copies. It also gave B'z their 64th combined week in the number one position, beating Pink Lady's 1979 record of 63 combined weeks. In addition, the song reached number one on the Billboard Japan Hot 100 and the Top Singles Sales chart. It was ranked #37 at Oricon's 2015 year-end chart and #39 at Billboard Japan. The Recording Industry Association of Japan certified the single Gold for its sales of 100,000 copies.

Track listing

Certifications

References

External links 
 

2015 singles
2015 songs
B'z songs
Oricon Weekly number-one singles
Billboard Japan Hot 100 number-one singles